Chur West railway station is a railway station in Chur, Switzerland. It is located on the Landquart–Thusis line of the Rhaetian Railway. It is served twice hourly by Chur S-Bahn trains in each direction. Some daytime long-distance services also stop at this station.

Services
The following services stop at Chur West:

 Chur S-Bahn:
 : hourly service between Rhäzüns and Schiers.
 : hourly service between Thusis and Chur.

References

External links
 
 

Railway stations in Graubünden
Rhaetian Railway stations
Transport in Chur
Railway stations in Switzerland opened in 2000

de:Chur West#Haltepunkt Chur West